Daviesia rhombifolia is a species of flowering plant in the family Fabaceae and is endemic to the south-west of Western Australia. It is a bushy, spreading shrub with scattered, rhombus-shaped, sharply-pointed phyllodes, and orange and dark red flowers.

Description

Taxonomy
Daviesia rhombifolia was first formally described in 1844 by Carl Meissner in Lehmann's Plantae Preissianae. The specific epithet (rhombifolia) means "rhombus-leaved".

Distribution and habitat
This daviesia grows in forest or kwongan between Perth, Merredin, Lake King and Munglinup in the Avon Wheatbelt, Jarrah Forest, Mallee, and Swan Coastal Plain biogeographic regions of south-western Western Australia.

Conservation status 
Daviesia rhombifolia is listed as "not threatened" by the Government of Western Australia Department of Biodiversity, Conservation and Attractions.

References 

rhombifolia
Taxa named by Carl Meissner
Plants described in 1844
Flora of Western Australia